Celina is a genus of predaceous diving beetles in the family Dytiscidae. There are at least 30 described species in Celina.

Species
These 34 species belong to the genus Celina.

References

Further reading

 
 
 
 
 
 

Dytiscidae